Cadan Murley (born 31 July 1999) is an English professional rugby union player who plays as a wing for Premiership Rugby club Harlequins.

Rugby career

Club
In January 2018 Murley made his club debut for Harlequins against Scarlets in the Anglo-Welsh Cup. He started in the Premiership final against Exeter Chiefs on 26 June 2021 as Harlequins won the game 40-38 in the highest scoring Premiership final ever.

International
In 2017 Murley represented the England under-18 team scoring tries in games against Ireland and France. He scored a try in a defeat against Ireland during the opening round of the 2019 Six Nations Under 20s Championship. An elbow injury sustained in a league match against Northampton Saints ruled him out of selection for the 2019 World Rugby Under 20 Championship.

In January 2023 he was called up by Steve Borthwick to the senior England squad for the 2023 Six Nations Championship.

References

External links

1999 births
Living people
English rugby union players
Harlequin F.C. players
People educated at Bishop Wordsworth's School
Rugby union players from Frimley
Rugby union wings